Abigail "Abi" Tripp (born January 6, 2001) is a Canadian Paralympic swimmer. She has won two bronze medals: one in the Commonwealth Games and the other in the World Para Swimming Championships.

References

External links
  (archive)
 

2001 births
Living people
Canadian female backstroke swimmers
Canadian female freestyle swimmers
Canadian female medley swimmers
Paralympic swimmers of Canada
Swimmers at the 2016 Summer Paralympics
Medalists at the World Para Swimming Championships
S8-classified Paralympic swimmers
Swimmers at the 2018 Commonwealth Games
Commonwealth Games competitors for Canada
Commonwealth Games bronze medallists for Canada
Commonwealth Games medallists in swimming
Medallists at the 2018 Commonwealth Games